Karl Edvard Wahlberg (31 March 1874 – 1 August 1934) was a Swedish curler who won a silver medal at the 1924 Winter Olympics. He was a national champion in 1917 and 1934.

References

External links

1874 births
1934 deaths
Sportspeople from Stockholm
Swedish male curlers
Olympic curlers of Sweden
Olympic silver medalists for Sweden
Curlers at the 1924 Winter Olympics
Medalists at the 1924 Winter Olympics
Swedish curling champions